Greenside Primary School is a coeducational primary school in Westville Road in Hammersmith, London, England.

Architecture
Greenside Primary School is a Grade II* listed building built in 1952 and designed by the internationally renowned architect Ernő Goldfinger.

Greenside Primary School (along with Brandlehow School) is one of the two only examples of pre-cast reinforced concrete frame with brick infill designed by Goldfinger after the Second World War with the objective of re-built schools in a functional, fast and economical manner.

The building has a fine top lit mural by artist Gordon Cullen that was restored in 2014.

History
The school is on the site of a Victorian Board School, built in 1886 to accommodate 1,200 children and offer a ‘serviceable education at very low fees.’  The old school was bombed in 1944, but fortunately the children had already been evacuated.

The current building was opened in 1952, originally named Westville Road School. In 1987 it was renamed Greenside School.

References

Bibliography
 Warburton, Nigel. Ernő Goldfinger: The Life of an Architect (Routledge, 2004) .

External links

Greenside Primary School official website
Historic England website

Gallery

Modernist architecture in London
Grade II* listed buildings in the London Borough of Hammersmith and Fulham
School buildings completed in 1952
Primary schools in the London Borough of Hammersmith and Fulham
Grade II* listed educational buildings
Ernő Goldfinger buildings
Academies in the London Borough of Hammersmith and Fulham